Sándor Zombori (born 31 October 1951 in Pécs) is a Hungarian football player who participated in the 1978 World Cup where Hungary was eliminated in the first round. Despite this early exit, Zombori scored a fine goal in his team's defeat to France.

From 1975 to 1982, he played for Vasas SC before leaving Hungary for France where he played for Montpellier Hérault Sport Club

In Montpellier Hérault SC, He played 85 matches and scored 14 goals in the French second division and in the French Cup, he played in 6 games and scored 3 goals.

His son Zalán was formed at Montpellier HSC during the 1992–1993 season.

References

External links 
 
 
 
 Player Profile at MHSC foot
 Magyar Version of Wikipedia

1951 births
Living people
Hungarian footballers
Pécsi MFC players
Vasas SC players
Montpellier HSC players
Hungarian expatriate footballers
Hungarian expatriate sportspeople in France
Expatriate footballers in France
Hungary international footballers
1978 FIFA World Cup players
Sportspeople from Pécs
Association football midfielders